Falaknuma Das is a 2019 Indian Telugu-language action thriller film written and directed by Vishwak Sen. It was produced by Vishwak's father, Karate Raju, under Vanmaye Creations, in association with Vishwak Sen Cinemas, Terranova Pictures, and Media9 Creative Works. The film was presented by D. Suresh Babu, under Suresh Productions. It is the remake of the 2017 Malayalam cult hit, Angamaly Diaries. Sen starred alongside Saloni Mishra, Harshita Gaur, Prashanthi Charuolingah, Uttej, and Tharun Bhascker.

Plot
This is a story about the undesirable outcome that awaits a man with uncontrollable aggression. Das (Vishwak Sen) is a young man from Falaknuma who lives with his mother and sister. He forms a gang with his childhood friends, and their role models are Shankar Anna and Peg Pandu (Uttej). As they grow up, they grew fond of them, looking up to them as their mentors. Meanwhile, Das and Tina, who is his childhood friend, get into a relationship. One day, Shankar Anna gets murdered by two gangsters named Ravi and Raju, and they go to jail for that, and it devastates Das.
Fast forward, after a few years, Das breaks-up with Tina and get into a serious relationship with Sakhi (Harshita Gaur), whose parents are staying in Germany. It is very important that Das need a livelihood so that he can get an acceptance from Sakhi's parents. So, he tries his hands in the cable business and moves on to set up Mutton shop with Peg Pandu's guidance. But, Ravi and Raju, the gangsters, are the wholesale Meat suppliers in Faluknama and Das and his gang approach them to get their permission to set Mutton shop Business and name the shop after Shankar Anna. Later, they build their own business.

Rinku is Raju and Ravi's brother-in-law, and he gets into a fight with Das in a circumstance. Rinku wants revenge for it. Meanwhile, due to competitive business, Ravi threatens Das to close his business and hurls a bomb at Das's shop. This enraged Das, and he approaches Mallesham to get crude Bombs for himself.

Pandu mediates with Ravi and Raju to end the fighting and let the business run peacefully, and they accept it. But, Rinku provokes Das and his friends to fight and results in the death of Rinku's friend Anish in a bomb blast. It ends up with a police case where Rinku is the prime witness. Das breaks up with Sakhi to avoid dragging her into this situation. Zoya (Saloni Mishra), who is Das's friend's sister, starts feeling sympathetic towards Das.

Later, Ravi and Raju accept to make a deal upon which Das has to pay Rs. 20 Lakhs to withdraw the police case. It is interesting how Das can get out of this situation while surviving assassination attempts from Rinku.

Cast 

 Vishwak Sen as 'Falaknuma' Das
 Saloni Mishra as Zoya
Harshita Gaur as Sakhi
 Prasanthi Charuolingah as Tina
 Uttej as Peg Pandu
 Tharun Bhascker as Saidulu
 Vivek Chepuri as Ravi
 Sunjit Akkinepally as Raju
 Sharath Sreerangam as Mahesh
 Venkatesh Kakumanu as Circuit
 Sonu Shahnawaz as Filament
 Jeevan Kumar as Shankar Anna
 Master Aman as Child Das 
 Bala Parasar as Das Mother 
 Anmona Chaliha as Das Sister 
 Laxman Meesala as Laxman
 Praneeth Reddy Kallem as Rinku
 John Kottoly as Mallesh
 Abhinav Gomatam as Psychiatrist (cameo)

Music 
The soundtrack for the film is composed by Vivek Sagar. Lyrics of this film are written by Suddala Ashok Teja, Bhaskarbhatla Ravikumar and Kittu Vissapragada.

Release 
The film is released on 31 May 2019.

Critical Reception 
Falaknuma Das received negative reviews from critics. Hemanth Kumar of Firstpost gave the film 2.5 out of 5 stars and wrote "Falaknuma Das is like eating mutton biryani. The aroma and taste knocks you out for sometime, and once you get used to the flavour, it loses the very charm that made you crave for it". Neeshita Nyayapati Of The Times Of India gave the film a rating of 2 out of 5 and wrote "The biggest drawback of Falaknuma Das is the lack of structure in its narrative, for it does show potential by shining through in the most unsuspecting moments with its subtle humour".

Krishna Sripada of The News Minute gave the film 2 out of 5 stars and wrote "Falaknuma Das is a realistic crime drama that revolves around a testosterone-driven, eternally animalistic, mindless bunch of toxic men forever courting trouble". Y Sunita Chowdhary of The Hindu wrote "A gritty story, native narrative and great performances make ‘Falaknuma Das’ an interesting watch".

Accolades

References

External links
 

2010s Telugu-language films
Indian action thriller films
Telugu remakes of Malayalam films
2019 films
2019 action thriller films
Films set in Hyderabad, India
Films shot in Hyderabad, India